Takahiro Yamazaki (山崎 隆広, born October 11, 1976 in Shizuoka City) is a former Japanese professional baseball outfielder for the Tohoku Rakuten Golden Eagles in Japan's Nippon Professional Baseball. He played from 2006 to 2009.

His younger brother Tetsuya is a former Japanese footballer.

External links

1976 births
Living people
People from Shizuoka (city)
Japanese baseball players
Tohoku Rakuten Golden Eagles players